Debrosania is a genus of moths of the family Noctuidae erected by Emilio Berio in 1993. They are known from Tanzania.

Type-species: Debrosania puechredoni Berio, 1993

References

Catocalinae